The year 1974 in architecture involved some significant architectural events and new buildings.

Events
 Heikkinen – Komonen Architects established by Mikko Heikkinen and Markku Komonen in Helsinki, Finland.

Buildings and structures

Buildings opened

 Sears Tower in Chicago, Illinois, United States, designed by Skidmore, Owings and Merrill.
 Birmingham Central Library, Birmingham, UK, designed by John Madin (closed 2013).
 Horseferry Road Magistrates' Court in Westminster, London, designed by C. A. Legerton

Buildings completed

May 18 – The Warsaw radio mast in Poland, the second tallest structure ever built (it collapses on August 8, 1991).
date unknown
 Renaissance Tower in Dallas, Texas, USA.
 AT&T Long Lines Building, 33 Thomas Street, New York, USA, designed by John Carl Warnecke.
 Kamzik TV Tower in Bratislava, Slovakia.
 Guy's Tower in London, United Kingdom, the world's tallest hospital at this time.
 Hudson Bay Centre in Toronto, Ontario, Canada.
 Palace of Weddings, Vilnius, Lithuanian Soviet Socialist Republic, designed by Gediminas Baravykas.
 Plastic classroom, Kennington Primary School, Preston, England.
 Hotel du Lac, Tunis, designed by Raffaele Contigiani.
 Laurie Short House in Sydney, Australia, designed by Glenn Murcutt.

Awards
 Architecture Firm Award – Kevin Roche John Dinkeloo and Associates
 RAIA Gold Medal – Raymond Berg
 RIBA Royal Gold Medal – Powell & Moya
 Twenty-five Year Award – Johnson and Son Administration Building

Births
 October 2 – Bjarke Ingels, Danish architect

Deaths
 March 17 – Louis Kahn, American architect based in Philadelphia, USA (born 1901)
 April 6 – Willem Marinus Dudok, Dutch modernist architect (born 1884)
 April 25 – Gustavo R. Vincenti, Maltese architect and developer (born 1888)
 September 3 - Romuald Gutt, Polish architect (born 1888)
 November 28 – Konstantin Melnikov, Russian architect and painter (born 1890)
 December 12 – Sir Edward Maufe, English architect (born 1882)

References

 
20th-century architecture